Wuori may refer to:

People
 Eero A. Wuori, Finnish journalist
 Matti Wuori, Finnish politician

Places
 Wuori Township, St. Louis County, Minnesota, United States